The War Powers Resolution (also known as the War Powers Resolution of 1973 or the War Powers Act) is a federal law intended to check the U.S. president's power to commit the United States to an armed conflict without the consent of the U.S. Congress. The resolution was adopted in the form of a United States congressional joint resolution. It provides that the president can send the U.S. Armed Forces into action abroad only by declaration of war by Congress, "statutory authorization", or in case of "a national emergency created by attack upon the United States, its territories or possessions, or its armed forces".

The War Powers Resolution requires the president to notify Congress within 48 hours of committing armed forces to military action and forbids armed forces from remaining for more than 60 days, with a further 30-day withdrawal period, without congressional authorization for use of military force (AUMF) or a declaration of war by the United States. The resolution was passed by two-thirds each of the House and Senate, overriding the veto of President Richard Nixon.

It has been alleged that the War Powers Resolution has been violated in the past – for example, by George W. Bush invading Iraq in 2003 or by President Bill Clinton in 1999, during NATO bombing of Yugoslavia. Congress has disapproved all such incidents, but none has resulted in any successful legal actions being taken against the president for alleged violations.

Background
Under the United States Constitution, war powers are divided. Under Article I, Section 8, Congress has the power to:

declare war
grant Letters of Marque and Reprisal (i.e., license private citizens to capture enemy vessels)
raise and support Armies (for terms up to two years at a time)
provide and maintain a Navy
make Rules for the Government and Regulation of the land and naval Forces
provide for calling forth the Militia
make Rules concerning Captures on Land and Water
provide for organizing, arming, and disciplining, the Militia; and
govern such Part of [the militia] as may be employed in the Service of the United States.

Section 8 further provides that the states have the power to:

Appoint the Officers of the militia; and
train the Militia according to the discipline prescribed by Congress.

Article II, Section 2 provides that:

"The president shall be Commander in Chief of the Army and Navy of the United States, and of the Militia of the several States, when called into the actual Service of the United States"

It is generally agreed that the commander-in-chief role gives the President power to repel attacks against the United States and makes the President responsible for leading the armed forces. The President has the right to sign or veto congressional acts, such as a declaration of war, and Congress may override any such presidential veto. Additionally, when the president's actions (or inactions) provide "Aid and Comfort" to enemies or levy war against the United States, then Congress has the power to impeach and remove (convict) the president for treason. For actions short of treason, they can remove the president for "Bribery, or other high Crimes and Misdemeanors", the definition of which the Supreme Court has left up to Congress. Therefore, the war power was intentionally split between Congress and the Executive to prevent unilateral executive action that is contrary to the wishes of Congress, and require a super-majority for legislative action that is contrary to the wishes of the president.

History

Background and passage

During the Vietnam War, the United States found itself involved for many years in situations of intense conflict without a declaration of war. Many members of Congress became concerned with the erosion of congressional authority to decide when the United States should become involved in a war or the use of armed forces that might lead to war. It was prompted by news leaking out that President Nixon conducted secret bombings of Cambodia during the Vietnam War without notifying Congress.

The War Powers Resolution was passed by both the House of Representatives and Senate but was vetoed by President Richard Nixon. By a two-thirds vote in each house, Congress overrode the veto and enacted the joint resolution into law on November 7, 1973.

Implementation, 1993–2002
Presidents have submitted 130 reports to Congress as a result of the War Powers Resolution, although only one (the Mayagüez incident) cited Section 4(a)(1) and specifically stated that forces had been introduced into hostilities or imminent danger.

Congress invoked the War Powers Resolution in the Multinational Force in Lebanon Act (P.L. 98-119), which authorized the Marines to remain in Lebanon for 18 months during 1982 and 1983. In addition, the Authorization for Use of Military Force Against Iraq Resolution of 1991, which authorized United States combat operations against Iraqi forces during the 1991 Gulf War, stated that it constituted specific statutory authorization within the meaning of the War Powers Resolution.

On November 9, 1994, the House used a section of the War Powers Resolution to state that U.S. forces should be withdrawn from Somalia by March 31, 1994; Congress had already taken this action in appropriations legislation. More recently, under President Clinton, war powers were at issue in former Yugoslavia, Bosnia, Kosovo, Iraq, and Haiti, and under President George W. Bush in responding to terrorist attacks against the U.S. after September 11, 2001. "[I]n 1999, President Clinton kept the bombing campaign in Kosovo going for more than two weeks after the 60-day deadline had passed. Even then, however, the Clinton legal team opined that its actions were consistent with the War Powers Resolution because Congress had approved a bill funding the operation, which they argued constituted implicit authorization. That theory was controversial because the War Powers Resolution specifically says that such funding does not constitute authorization." Clinton's actions in Kosovo were challenged by a member of Congress as a violation of the War Powers Resolution in the D.C. Circuit case Campbell v. Clinton, but the court found the issue was a non-justiciable political question. It was also accepted that because Clinton had withdrawn from the region 12 days prior the 90-day required deadline, he had managed to comply with the act.

After the 1991 Gulf War, the use of force to obtain Iraqi compliance with United Nations resolutions, particularly through enforcement of Iraqi no-fly zones, remained a war powers issue. In October 2002 Congress enacted the Authorization for Use of Military Force Against Iraq , which authorized President George W. Bush to use force as necessary to defend the United States against Iraq and enforce relevant United Nations Security Council Resolutions. This was in addition to the Authorization for Use of Military Force of 2001.

Libya, 2011

Secretary of State Hillary Clinton testified to congress in March 2011 that the Obama administration did not need congressional authorization for its military intervention in Libya or for further decisions about it, despite congressional objections from members of both parties that the administration was violating the War Powers Resolution.  During that classified briefing, she reportedly indicated that the administration would sidestep the Resolution's provision regarding a 60-day limit on unauthorized military actions.  Months later, she stated that, with respect to the military operation in Libya, the United States was still flying a quarter of the sorties, and the New York Times reported that, while many presidents had bypassed other sections of the War Powers Resolution, there was little precedent for exceeding the 60-day statutory limit on unauthorized military actions – a limit which the Justice Department had said in 1980 was constitutional. The State Department publicly took the position in June 2011 that there was no "hostility" in Libya within the meaning of the War Powers Resolution, contrary to legal interpretations in 2011 by the Department of Defense and the Department of Justice Office of Legal Counsel.

May 20, 2011, marked the 60th day of US combat in Libya (as part of the UN resolution) but the deadline arrived without President Obama seeking specific authorization from the US Congress. President Obama notified Congress that no authorization was needed, since the US leadership had been transferred to NATO, and since US involvement was somewhat "limited". In fact, as of April 28, 2011, the US had conducted 75 percent of all aerial refueling sorties, supplied 70 percent of the operation's intelligence, surveillance, and reconnaissance, and contributed 24 percent of the total aircraft used in the operation. By September, the US had conducted 26 percent of all military sorties, contributing more resources to Operation Unified Protector than any other NATO country. The State Department requested (but never received) express congressional authorization.

On Friday, June 3, 2011, the US House of Representatives voted to rebuke President Obama for maintaining an American presence in the NATO operations in Libya, which they considered a violation of the War Powers Resolution.  In The New York Times, an opinion piece by Yale Law Professor Bruce Ackerman stated that Obama's position "lacks a solid legal foundation. And by adopting it, the White House has shattered the traditional legal process the executive branch has developed to sustain the rule of law over the past 75 years."

Syria, 2012–2017

In late 2012 or early 2013, at the direction of U.S. President Barack Obama, the Central Intelligence Agency (CIA) was put in charge of Timber Sycamore, a covert program to arm and train the rebels who were fighting against Syrian President Bashar Assad, while the State Department supplied the Free Syrian Army with non-lethal aid. Following the use of chemical weapons in the Syrian Civil War on several occasions, including the Ghouta chemical attack on 21 August 2013, Obama asked Congress for authorization to use military force in Syria, which Congress rejected. Instead, Congress passed a bill that specified that the Defense Secretary was authorized "...to provide assistance, including training, equipment, supplies, and sustainment, to appropriately vetted elements of the Syrian opposition and other appropriately vetted Syrian groups and individuals...." The bill specifically prohibited the introduction of U.S. troops or other U.S. forces into hostilities. The bill said: "Nothing in this section shall be construed to constitute a specific statutory authorization for the introduction of United States Armed Forces into hostilities or into situations wherein hostilities are clearly indicated by the circumstances."

In spite of the prohibition, Obama, and later U.S. President Trump, introduced ground forces into Syria, and the United States became fully engaged in the country, though these troops were primarily for training allied forces. On April 6, 2017, the United States launched 59 BGM-109 Tomahawk missiles at Shayrat airbase in Syria in response to Syria's alleged use of chemical weapons. Constitutional scholar and law professor Stephen Vladeck has noted that the strike potentially violated the War Powers Resolution.

Yemen, 2018–2019

In 2018, Senators Bernie Sanders (I–VT), Chris Murphy (D–CT), and Mike Lee (R–UT) sponsored a bill to invoke the War Powers Resolution and to end U.S. support for the Saudi-led military intervention in Yemen, which has resulted in thousands of civilian casualties and "millions more suffering from starvation and disease." 

Sanders first introduced the bill in the 115th Congress in February 2018, but the Senate voted to table the motion in March 2018. Interest grew in the bill after the assassination of Jamal Khashoggi in October 2018, with the Senate also approving a resolution holding Saudi Crown Prince Mohammed Bin Salman responsible for Khashoggi's death. The Senate voted 56-to-41 to invoke the War Powers Resolution in December 2018. However, the House of Representatives did not vote on the resolution before the conclusion of the 115th Congress.

The bill was introduced in the 116th Congress in January 2019 with Sanders announcing a vote to take place on March 13, 2019. The bill was approved by the Senate in a 54–46 vote and was approved by the House of Representatives 247–175.

The bill was vetoed by President Trump on April 16, 2019. On May 2, 2019, the Senate failed to reach the two-thirds majority vote in order to override the veto.

Iran, 2020
 

On January 4, 2020, the White House officially notified Congress that it had carried out a fatal drone strike against Iranian General Qasem Soleimani a day earlier. House Speaker Nancy Pelosi said that the entire document was classified and that it "raises more questions than it answers." Senate Majority Leader Mitch McConnell said he would set up a classified briefing for all senators. 

Senator Tim Kaine (D–VA) had already introduced a resolution to prevent the U.S. Armed Forces or any part of the government to use hostilities against Iran. Senator Bernie Sanders (I–VT) and Representative Ro Khanna (D–CA) introduced an anti-funding resolution, also on January 3.

The Trump Administration stated that the attack on Qasem Soleimani was carried out in accordance with the War Powers Resolution under the Authorization for Use of Military Force (AUMF) resolution of 2001. The legalities of using the AUMF for endless conflicts has been a source of debate.

On February 13, 2020, the Senate passed a similar legally-binding privileged resolution by a vote of 55–45. Trump vetoed the Senate resolution on May 6, 2020, stating the resolution mistakenly "implies that the president’s constitutional authority to use military force is limited to defense of the United States and its forces against imminent attack." Kaine stated Trump's veto could enable "endless wars" and "unnecessary war in the Middle East". The Senate attempted to override the veto the following day. The attempt need at least 67 votes to override, with it failing by a vote of 49–44

Questions regarding constitutionality

The War Powers Resolution has been controversial since it was passed. In passing the resolution, Congress specifically cites the Necessary and Proper Clause for its authority. Under the Necessary and Proper Clause, it is specifically provided that the Congress shall have the power to make all laws necessary and proper for carrying into execution, not only its own powers but also all other powers vested by the Constitution in the Government of the United States, or in any department or officer thereof.

There is controversy over whether the War Powers Resolution's constraints on the President's authority as Commander-in-Chief are consistent with the Constitution. Presidents have therefore drafted reports to Congress required of the President to state that they are "consistent with" the War Powers Resolution rather than "pursuant to" so as to take into account the presidential position that the resolution is unconstitutional.

One argument for the unconstitutionality of the War Powers Resolution by Philip Bobbitt argues "The power to make war is not an enumerated power" and the notion that to "declare" war is to "commence" war is a "contemporary textual preconception". Bobbitt contends that the Framers of the Constitution believed that statutory authorization was the route by which the United States would be committed to war, and that 'declaration' was meant for only total wars, as shown by the history of the Quasi-War with France (1798–1800). In general, constitutional powers are not so much separated as "linked and sequenced"; Congress's control over the armed forces is "structured" by appropriation, while the President commands; thus the act of declaring war should not be fetishized. Bobbitt also argues that "A democracy cannot ... tolerate secret policies" because they undermine the legitimacy of governmental action.

A second argument concerns a possible breach of the 'separation of powers' doctrine, and whether the resolution changes the balance between the Legislative and Executive functions.
This type of constitutional controversy is similar to one that occurred under President Andrew Johnson with the Tenure of Office Act (1867). In that prior instance, the Congress passed a law (over the veto of the then-President) that required the President to secure Congressional approval for the removal of Cabinet members and other executive branch officers. The Act was not declared unconstitutional by the Supreme Court of the United States until 1926. When Andrew Johnson violated the Act, the House of Representatives impeached him; action in the Senate to remove him failed by one vote during his impeachment trial.

Here, the separation of powers issue is whether the War Powers Resolution requirements for Congressional approval and presidential reporting to Congress change the constitutional balance established in Articles I and II, namely that Congress is explicitly granted the sole authority to "declare war", "make Rules for the Government and Regulation of the land and naval Forces" (Article 1, Section 8), and to control the funding of those same forces, while the Executive has inherent authority as Commander in Chief. This argument does not address the other reporting requirements imposed on other executive officials and agencies by other statutes, nor does it address the provisions of Article I, Section 8 that explicitly gives Congress the authority to "make Rules for the Government and Regulation of the land and naval Forces".

The constitution specifically states that Congress is authorized "to provide and maintain a Navy" (Article 1 Section 8). The idea of "maintenance" of a Navy implies that Naval Forces would be a permanent fixture of national defense. Two types of Land Forces are described by the Constitution (Article 1 Section 8): the Militia (armed citizenry organized into local defense forces and state volunteer regiments) which Congress can "call forth" and prescribe the "organizing, arming, and disciplining [training]" of, as Congress did in the Militia acts of 1792; and the Army, which Congress can "raise and support", through regular appropriation acts limited to no more than two years. This division matches how the Revolutionary War was fought, by the Continental Army, raised and supported by the Continental Congress, and local Militias and Volunteer Regiments, raised by the separate Colonies. After the war, under the Articles of Confederation, a small standing Army, the First American Regiment was raised and gradually increased in size over time by Congress before, following the Constitution's ratification, being transformed into the Regular Army. The availability of a standing Army, and the President of the United States being authorized as "Commander in Chief", implies his ability as a military commander to employ forces necessary to fulfill his oath to defend the constitution.

There is also an unresolved legal question, discussed by Justice White in INS v. Chadha of whether a "key provision of the War Powers Resolution", namely 50 U.S.C. 1544(c), constitutes an improper legislative veto. (See Chadha, 462 U.S. 919, 971.) That section 1544(c) states "such forces shall be removed by the President if the Congress so directs by concurrent resolution". Justice White argues in his dissent in Chadha that, under the Chadha ruling, 1544(c) would be a violation of the Presentment Clause. The majority in Chadha does not resolve the issue. Justice White does not address or evaluate in his dissent whether that section would fall within the inherent Congressional authority under Article I Section 8 to "make Rules for the Government and Regulation of the land and naval Forces". A post-Chadha argument for the constitutionality of the concurrent resolution is that the War Powers Resolution does not delegate legislative authority to the President, and that the Chadha ruling applies only when Congress seeks to revoke a delegation of its authority. 

A hearing was held before the Subcommittee on Federal Spending Oversight and Emergency Management of the Committee on Homeland Security and Governmental Affairs, United States Senate, on June 6, 2018, on war powers and the effects of unauthorized military engagements on federal spending. The witnesses giving testimony before the subcommittee were law professors Andrew Napolitano and Jonathan Turley, and Christopher Anders of the ACLU.

References

Sources

External links

 Avalon Project - War Powers Resolution
 The War Powers Resolution: After Twenty-Eight Years November 15, 2001 PDF
 The War Powers Resolution: Concepts and Practice March 28, 2017 PDF
 War Powers Resolution: Presidential Compliance September 11, 2001 HTML
 War Powers Resolution: Presidential Compliance January 8, 2002 PDF
 War Powers Resolution : Presidential Compliance March 16, 2004 PDF
 War Powers Resolution: Presidential Compliance November 15, 2004 PDF
 The War Powers Resolution: After Thirty Years

Congressional opposition to the Vietnam War
United States federal defense and national security legislation
1973 in law
1973 in military history
1973 in the United States
Military history of the United States
Nixon administration controversies